Beverly Davenport (born ) is an American academic who most recently served as the Chancellor of the University of Tennessee, from February 15, 2017, until she was effectively removed from the position on May 2, 2018. Under her original contract, she was to become a professor, but following an agreement on June 5, 2018, left the university.

Executive leadership

Chancellor, University of Tennessee
Davenport began serving as the Chancellor of The University of Tennessee, Knoxville, on February 15, 2017. On May 2, 2018 The University of Tennessee system president, Joseph A. DiPietro, announced Davenport's appointment would end July 1, 2018 and she would transition to the faculty of the College of Communication and Information. The next day DiPietro announced Wayne Davis, the dean of UT's Tickle College of Engineering, would succeed Davenport as the interim chancellor for six to 12 months. On June 5, 2018, a committee of The University of Tennessee Board of Trustees approved a separation agreement with Davenport, ending her employment that day with a payment of 1.33 million USD.

Interim president, University of Cincinnati
Prior to her appointment at Tennessee, Davenport served as the 29th President at the University of Cincinnati in an interim capacity following the departure of the former President, Santa Ono, who left for the presidency of the University of British Columbia. Her interim appointment at UC followed a three-year stint as the Senior Vice President for Academic Affairs and Provost.

Academic career
Prior to her appointment as UC's interim president, Davenport served as its provost and chief academic officer from 2013 to 2016. During her tenure as provost, she led efforts that resulted in record-setting enrollments, significant advances in retention and graduation rates, and rises in U.S. News & World Report rankings. She launched aggressive faculty recruitment initiatives including a $60 million Cluster Hiring Initiative, a Strategic Hiring Opportunity Program, and a Dual Career Assistance Program that significantly increased the number of women and underrepresented minority faculty hired.

Prior to her arrival at UC in 2013, Davenport served as Vice Provost for Faculty Affairs at Purdue University, where she managed a broad portfolio of faculty-focused initiatives, ranging from a $70 million faculty cluster hiring initiative to faculty development programs. She launched and served as the inaugural director of the Susan Bulkeley Butler Center for Leadership and started Purdue Women Lead. She also served as the director of the Discovery Learning Center, part of Purdue's early interdisciplinary efforts to develop their innovation and commercialization hub.

Before her arrival at Purdue, Davenport served as a senior fellow at Virginia Tech, divisional dean for the social sciences at the University of Kansas and chair of the Department of Communication at the University of Kentucky.

Scholarship
An accomplished scholar, Davenport has authored more than 100 papers and articles. She has edited three books on the quality of work life and workplace civility:

 Destructive Organizational Communication: Processes, Consequences, and Constructive Ways of Organizing (co-edited with Pamela Lutgen-Sandvik, Routledge, 2009)
 Case Studies in Organizational Communication 2: Perspectives on Contemporary Work Life (Guilford Press, 1997)
 Case Studies in Organizational Communication (Guilford Press, 1990)

She also has engaged in research on telehealth and telehospice and has been a consultant on a funded project in the Peruvian Amazon to disseminate reproductive health information. Early in her career, Davenport was a consultant on projects ranging from the adoption of new technologies in the workplace and the introduction of new communication innovations research on the role of communication abilities in predicting upward mobility at companies including IBM, Dow Corning, CIGNA and a variety of for-profit and nonprofit organizations as well as government agencies.
 
Davenport has been the principal investigator or co-principal investigator for more than $19 million of funding from the National Science Foundation, the United States Department of Education and various foundations.

Awards
Davenport has been recognized for excellence in teaching and advances in technology-infused learning at multiple universities and from the National Communication Association. She was named a University of Kentucky Great Teacher, a University of Kansas W.T. Kemper Fellow for Excellence in Teaching, and a Mortar Board and Phi Beta Kappa outstanding professor. She and her team were a MIRA award winner from Techpoint for their work on game-based learning when she was at Purdue.

Davenport serves on Harvard's COACHE National Advisory Council, UT-Battelle Board of Governors, the University of Tennessee Health System Board of Trustees and the advisory board for ConnectKnox.

In 2014, she received Cincinnati's C-Suite Award for Outstanding Leadership, and in 2013, she was named one of the 40 most influential women in the 40 years of Purdue University's celebration of Title IX.

References

1950s births
Year of birth missing (living people)
Living people
Leaders of the University of Tennessee Knoxville
Presidents of the University of Cincinnati
University of Michigan alumni
People from Bowling Green, Kentucky